LGBTQ Film of the Year is one of the main categories of Dorian Awards, and it has been given annually since 2009. It was called LGBT-Themed Film of the Year from 2009 to 2011, and LGBT Film of the Year in 2012 and 2013.

List of winners 
 2009 – A Single Man, directed by Tom Ford
 2010 – I Love You Phillip Morris, directed by Glenn Ficarra and John Requa
 2011 – Weekend, directed by Andrew Haigh
 2012 – Keep the Lights On, directed by Ira Sachs
 2013 – Blue Is the Warmest Colour, directed by Abdellatif Kechiche
 2014 – Pride , directed by Matthew Warchus
 2015 – Carol, directed by Todd Haynes
 2016 – Moonlight, directed by Barry Jenkins
 2017 – Call Me by Your Name, directed by Luca Guadagnino
 2018 – Can You Ever Forgive Me?, directed by Marielle Heller
 2019 – Portrait of a Lady on Fire, directed by Celine Sciamma
 2020 – Ma Rainey's Black Bottom, directed by George C. Wolfe
 2021 – Flee, directed by Jonas Poher Rasmussen
 2022 – Everything Everywhere All At Once, directed by Daniel Kwan and Daniel Scheinert, aka Daniels

References

External links 
 GALECA Official Website

Awards for best film